Mohanrao Kadam is a politician of the Indian National Congress. On 23 November 2016 he was elected to the Maharashtra Legislative Council from Local Areas Constituency of Sangli and Satara.

Positions held
Maharashtra Legislative Council

References

Year of birth missing (living people)
Living people
Indian National Congress politicians from Maharashtra